Ayobola Kekere-Ekun is a Nigerian contemporary visual artist.

Life 
Ayobola Kekere-Ekun was born in 1993 in Lagos, Nigeria. She had an interest in art from an early age, which was fostered through classes and support from her parents. Kekere-Ekun finished a degree in Graphic Design at the University of Lagos (UNILAG), Akoka in 2009 and also received her Master's Degree in the same field in 2016. She is the Assistant Lecturer in the Department of Creative Arts at the University of Lagos.

As of 2022, Kekere-Ekun was finishing her Ph.D., which started in 2018, in Art and Design at the University of Johannesburg, South Africa.

Artistic practice 
Kekere-Ekun combines her fascination with lines with a method called paper quilling, to form the visual aesthetic for her work. Her works highlight the themes of Nigerian femininity and its history, mythology, power dynamics and equality and their practical effects within Nigerian social spaces that may be prejudiced toward women. The artist investigates Nigerian femininity within historical and contemporary times alongside other themes particular to her social and geographical context.

Kekere-Ekun has exhibited her work at Rele Art Gallery in Lagos, Nigeria (2019); Guns & Rain, Johannesburg, South Africa (2019) and No End Contemporary Art Space (2019) in Johannesburg, South Africa and The Koppel Project Hive (2018) in London, England.

Select exhibitions 
 2020: Young Contemporaries Alumni Group Show (January), Rele Gallery, Lagos
 2019: Resilient Lines, Rele Gallery, Lagos, April (Solo)
 2019: Suffrage, Guns and Rains, Johannesburg, July
 2019: Imagine the Opposite, No End Contemporary, Johannesburg, May
 2018: Cu-ulture and Tradition: Same Experience, Different Local, Koppel Project Hive, London, October
 2017: Her Story, Rele Gallery, Lagos, February

Art Fairs 
 2018: Kekere-Ekun participated in ArtX Lagos, 
 2019: West Africa's first international art fair, her works were shown in both Latitude art fair and Turbine Art Fair in Johannesburg, South Africa.

Art magazines 
 2021: Featured in the "Artafrica" magazine

Reviews 
Kekere-Ekun's solo exhibition "Resilient Lines" 2019 is described as a necessary exhibition that discusses the politics of femininity within Nigeria. The artist is currently working in a time that seeks to write into history, the legacies of female artists in Nigeria that have often been disregarded in the past. Overall, her work is seen as vital, in contributing to the Nigerian community of art, that seeks to celebrate female artists in the country.

Honors 
In 2018, Kekere-Ekun received a prize for Creativity from The Future Awards Africa (TFAA). In the same year, she also received a $5,000 grant by music producer, Swizz Beats and musician, Alicia Keys, which she used to fund her solo exhibition, "Resilient Lines" at Rele Art Gallery in Lagos, Nigeria. In 2016, she received a grant from The Rele Art Foundation, as part of their "Young Contemporaries" program. Other awards she has received are the University of Lagos Convocation Prize in 2014 and the United States Consulate General 'Women's History Month' Art Contest in 2012. Ayobola Kekere-Ekun has been selected as one of the winners of the 2021 "Absa L'Atelier.'

References 

Living people
Year of birth missing (living people)
University of Lagos alumni
Academic staff of the University of Lagos
Artists from Lagos
Nigerian women artists
Nigerian women academics